Giuseppe Tacca (12 August 1917 – 18 October 1984) was an Italian-French professional road bicycle racer. He rode in the 1947, 1948 and 1949 Tour de France.

Italian by birth, he was naturalized French the 02 July 1948.

Major results

1946
Circuit du Maine-Libre
1947
Tour de France:
Winner stage 16
1948
Paris-Nantes
1950
Circuit de Morbihan

References

External links 

Official Tour de France results for Giuseppe Tacca
Giuseppe Tacca dans le Tour de France

1917 births
1984 deaths
French male cyclists
Italian male cyclists
Italian Tour de France stage winners
Sportspeople from the Province of Novara
French Tour de France stage winners
Cyclists from Piedmont